Amy Marie Sanders (born 5 June 1983) is an American college and professional basketball player. After playing for the Hawaii Rainbow Wahine, she moved to the Umeå Comets in the Swedish Damligan before signing with the Detroit Shock of the WNBA for the 2007 season. The next year she signed a training camp contract with the Sacramento Monarchs, but she subsequently returned to FIBA Europe basketball, playing for AZS Poznań in the Polish PLKK and Leipzig Eagles in the German Bundesliga.

College career
Sanders played youth basketball for the Orange County Spirit club. She had also been decorated for her performances for Mater Dei High School. In 2002, she joined University of Hawaii in preference to several other interested Universities. In her four-year varsity career, Sanders was twice the Hawaii Rainbow Wahine's top-pointscorer. In April 2005 she was voted the top player at the team's annual banquet. When Sanders played her last game for the Rainbow Wahine in February 2006, coach Jim Bolla described her as: "one of the hardest working players I've had in my years of coaching."

Hawai'i  statistics
Source

Club career
After the expiration of her college eligibility, Sanders was overlooked at the 2006 WNBA Draft. She signed for Sweden's Umeå Comets in September 2006 on a full–time professional contract. It was reported that she proved a successful acquisition for the team, but she left during the Christmas break in December to complete her studies in the United States.

Sanders was called into the training camp of reigning WNBA champions Detroit Shock in April 2007. In the 2007 WNBA season she featured in six games for the Shock—averaging one and a half minutes in each—before being waived from the team on July 2, 2007.

In January 2008 Sanders agreed a deal with Polish outfit AZS Poznań and she arrived the following month, to considerable local media attention. After playing seven PLKK matches, for an average of nine points, she departed AZS Poznań by mutual consent in March 2008. Sanders returned to the WNBA after being called into the Sacramento Monarchs' pre–season training camp as a free agent, but she was waived 11 days later without playing in a competitive game.

Having left basketball in summer 2008, Sanders was later tempted out of retirement to help financially troubled German Bundesliga club Leipzig Eagles. She made her debut in January 2010 against SV Halle and played for free during her time in Germany. When the team were relegated in March and the American coach Ritz Ingram left, Sanders and other senior players also made an exit.

Personal life
Sanders was born in Huntington Beach, California to Kim and Gary Sanders. She has one elder brother, Matthew, who is the lead vocalist of heavy metal band Avenged Sevenfold under the stage name M. Shadows.

References

External links
Amy Sanders career statistics at Basketball-Reference.com

1983 births
Living people
American expatriate basketball people in Germany
American expatriate basketball people in Poland
American expatriate basketball people in Sweden
American women's basketball players
Basketball players from California
Detroit Shock players
Hawaii Rainbow Wahine basketball players
Shooting guards
Sportspeople from Huntington Beach, California
Undrafted Women's National Basketball Association players